Ian Clarke may refer to:

Ian Clarke (computer scientist) (born 1977), Irish computer programmer, the original designer and lead developer of Freenet
Ian Clarke (physician) (born 1952), Irish-born physician, missionary, philanthropist, businessman, resident of Uganda
Ian Clarke (flautist) (born 1964), British classical flute player and composer
Ian Clarke (gymnast) (born 1946), Australian Olympic gymnast
Ian Clarke (drummer) (born 1946), drummer with the group Uriah Heep from 1970 to 1971 and Cressida
Ian Clarke (rugby union) (1931–1997), New Zealand rugby player, farmer and rugby administrator
Ian Clarke (soccer) (born 1975), Canadian soccer player
I. F. Clarke (1918–2009), known as Ian, British bibliographer and literary scholar

See also
Ian Clark (disambiguation)